Martini is an Italian surname.

Geographical distribution
As of 2014, 33.1% of all known bearers of the surname Martini were residents of Italy (frequency 1:1,079), 22.1% of Indonesia (1:3,494), 13.0% of Brazil (1:9,197), 7.1% of Tanzania (1:4,235), 6.2% of the United States (1:34,281), 4.4% of Germany (1:10,746), 3.5% of Argentina (1:7,191), 2.8% of France (1:13,999) and 1.2% of Albania (1:1,400).

In Italy, the frequency of the surname was higher than national average (1:1,079) in the following regions:
 1. Tuscany (1:281)
 2. Liguria (1:377)
 3. Veneto (1:474)
 4. Trentino-Alto Adige/Südtirol (1:725)
 5. Umbria (1:848)
 6. Lazio (1:869)
 7. Piedmont (1:889)
 8. Emilia-Romagna (1:911)

People
 Alessandro Martini (1812–1905), Italian businessman, founder of Martini & Rossi distillery
 Alviero Martini (born 1950), Italian fashion designer
 Angela Martini (born 1986), Albanian model
 Anita Martini, American journalist
 Anneli Martini (born 1948), Swedish actress
 Antonio Martini (1720–1809), Italian Archbishop and Bible translator
 Bruno Martini (1962–2020), French footballer 
 Carlo Maria Martini (1927–2012), Catholic cardinal
 Cathleen Martini (born 1982), German bobsledder
 Corinna Martini (born 1985), German luger
 Edi Martini (born 1975), Albanian football manager and former player
 Eduardo Martini (born 1979), Brazilian football (soccer) player
 Elisabeth Martini (1886–1984), American architect
 Ferdinand Martini (1870–1930), German film actor
 Ferdinando Martini (1841–1928), Italian writer and politician
 Francesco di Giorgio Martini (1439–1502), Italian painter, sculptor, architect and military engineer
 Francesco De Martini (1903–1981), Italian officer
 Friedrich Wilhelm Martini (1729–1780), German physician
 Giovanni Battista Martini (1706–1784), Italian musician
 Jandira Martini (born 1945), Brazilian actress and author of theatre and screenplays
 Jean Paul Egide Martini (1741–1816), Franco-German composer
 Jerry Martini (born 1943), American musician
 Joachim Carlos Martini (1931-2015), Chilean-born German conductor
 Johannes Martini (1440–1498), Franco-Flemish composer
 Johannes Martini (painter) (1866–1935), German oil painter and graphic artist
 Karl Anton von Martini (1726–1800), Austrian lawyer whose work strongly influenced the Austrian Civil Code of 1811
 Martino Martini (1614–1661), Italian Jesuit missionary and cartographer of China
 Mauro Martini (born 1964), Italian race car driver
 Max Martini (born 1969), American actor
 Mia Martini (1947–1995), Italian singer
Mohammad Rami Radwan Martini (born 1970), Syrian politician
 Moreno Martini (1935–2009), Italian athlete
 Nino Martini, Italian operatic tenor who also appeared in Hollywood movies of the 1930s
 Olaus Martini, Latin form of Olof Mårtensson (1557-1609), Swedish archbishop of Uppsala
 Oliver Martini (born 1971), Italian racing driver
 Paul Martini (born 1960), Canadian figure skater
 Percy Martini (1888–1961), Australian rules footballer 
 Pierluigi Martini (born 1961), Italian racing driver
 Richard Martini (born 1955), American film director, producer, screenwriter and freelance journalist
Richard Martini (born 1978), French footballer
 Simone Martini (1284–1344), Italian painter
 Steve Martini (born 1946), American legal suspense writer
 Stina Martini (born 1993), Austrian pair skater
 Truth Martini (born 1975), Albanian-American professional wrestler, manager, and trainer
 William J. Martini (born 1947), U.S. District Court Judge
 Wolfgang Martini (1891–1963), German Air Force Officer largely responsible for promoting early radar development

See also
 Mardini, an Arabic surname

References

Italian-language surnames
Surnames of Italian origin
Patronymic surnames
Surnames from given names